Prof. Ishtiyaq Ahmad Zilli  (born 2 May 1942), is a historian, Islamic, Quranic scholar and professor (retired) at Aligarh Muslim University, Aligarh India.
He is director/secretary of Darul Musannefin Shibli Academy, Azamgarh India since 2008 and president of Idarah Ulumul Quran (www.alquran.in) Aligarh India since 1984. His latest book is Tarikh-I-Firoz Shahi. His previous book was The Mughal State and Culture 1556-1598: Selected Letters and Documents from Munshaat Namakin. He is an alumnus of Madrasatul Islah (Saraimir), Madina University, Lucknow University and Aligarh Muslim University, from where he did his MA, M.Phil. and PhD in history. He retired as a professor of history, Centre of Advanced Study, Aligarh Muslim University.

References
 https://web.archive.org/web/20091015233233/http://www.archbishopofcanterbury.org/1504
 https://web.archive.org/web/20070928044329/http://www.isim.nl/files/annual_2001.pdf
 https://web.archive.org/web/20090829224821/http://preston.ae/guest-speaker-campusupdate-7.html

20th-century Indian historians
Indian Muslims
1942 births
Living people